Diego Gastón Giménez Díaz (born 7 December 1989) is a Uruguayan footballer who plays as a forward. He is currently a free agent.

Career
Giménez began his career with Danubio of the Uruguayan Primera División. He scored on his professional debut in a win against Miramar Misiones on 4 September 2010. Another goal followed on 7 November versus Tacuarembó, in a season which included nine appearances. On 12 July 2011, Giménez was loaned to fellow top-flight team Rentistas. During his second start, on 4 September 2011 against Cerro, Giménez scored his third career goal. One goal in eighteen further appearances arrived with the club. In August 2012, Giménez joined Uruguayan Segunda División side Rocha on loan. He went onto score once in fourteen games.

Career statistics
.

References

External links

1989 births
Living people
People from Treinta y Tres
Uruguayan footballers
Association football forwards
Uruguayan Primera División players
Uruguayan Segunda División players
Danubio F.C. players
C.A. Rentistas players
Rocha F.C. players